Edmund Hashim, also credited as Ed Hashim (June 2, 1933 – July 2, 1974) was an American actor. He was known for Hellfighters (1968), The Green Hornet (1967), several different roles in Gunsmoke (1966-1969), Giacobbe ed Esau (1963), Alfred Hitchcock Presents (1961), Brave Eagle (1955-1956), and many other roles between 1955 and 1971.

Filmography
Films and Television appearances follow.

Films

 Shaft (1971) as Lee
 Hellfighters (1968) as Colonel Valdez
 And Now Miguel (1966) as Eli
 The Last Ride to Santa Cruz (1964) as Sheriff
 Giacobbe ed Esau (1963)
 The Outsider (1961) as Jay Morago
 I Passed for White (1960) as Club Patron
 The Miracle (1959) as Soldier (uncredited)
 Omar Khayyam (1957) as Turkoman (uncredited)
 The Helen Morgan Story (1957) as Henchman (uncredited)
 Ghost Town (1956) as Stone Knife
 Quincannon, Frontier Scout (1956) as Iron Wolf
 The Ten Commandments (1956) as Captain of the Guards, Officer, and Captain of Trumpeters (uncredited)
 Kismet (1955) as Nobleman (uncredited)

Television

 Dark Shadows (1970) as Wilfred Block
 Another World (1969 ) as Wayne Addison
 Gunsmoke (1966-1969)
 Charlie Noon (1969) as Lone Wolf
 Time of the Jackals (1969) as Tim Jackson
 The Victim (1968) as Brock
 The Wreckers (1967) as Monk Wiley
 The Hanging (1966) as Saline
 The Brothers (1966) as Durgen
 The Raid: Part 1 (1966) as Johnny Barnes
 The Outsider (1969) as Phil Campos
 The Flying Nun (1968) as Alfredo Acquilar
 Mission: Impossible (1968) as Valesquez
 Run for Your Life (1966-1967)
 The Mustafa Embrace (1967) as Ahmed Mustafa
 Edge of the Volcano (1966) as Colonel Sientos
 The Wild Wild West (1967) as Col. Pedro Sanchez
 I Spy (1967) as Sharp
 The Green Hornet (1967) as Prince Rafil
 Get Smart (1966) as Carioca
 Perry Mason (1966) as Prince Ben Ali Bhudeem
 The Man from U.N.C.L.E. (1966) as Ali Tchard
 The Magical World of Disney (1964) as Duke
 The New Loretta Young Show (1963) as Sheik Ahmed
 Shotgun Slade (1961) as Damian
 Alfred Hitchcock Presents (1961)
 Keep Me Company as Marco Reddy
 Maria as El Magnifico
 Gratitude as Masotti
 Miami Undercover (1961) as Marty Blake
 Tales of Wells Fargo (1957-1961)
 Rifles for Red Hand (1961) as Wing
 White Indian (1958) as Indian
 Belle Star (1957) as Jim July
 The Detectives (1961) as Max Williams
 The Brothers Brannagan (1961) as Eric Sandoval
 Checkmate (1961) as Steve Krell
 Hong Kong (1961) as Father Serano
 Tombstone Territory (1960) as Manatou's Lieutenant
 The Untouchables (1960) as Matty Church
 Mackenzie's Raiders (1959) as Corporal Kill Eagle
 Richard Diamond, Private Detective (1959) as Carl Otero
 Wagon Train (1959) as Wamsutta
 The Third Man (1959) as Marcel
 Sky King (1959) as Sal
 Tales of the Texas Rangers (1958) as Black Eagle
 The Restless Gun (1958) as Indian Renegade Leader
 M Squad (1957) as Nick Arnold
 The Thin Man (1957) as Luigi Midelli
 The Sheriff of Cochise (1957) as George
 The Lone Ranger (1956)
 Ghost Canyon (1956) as Bright Eagle
 White Hawk's Decision (1956) as Little Hawk
 Matinee Theatre (1956)
 The Man Called X (1956) as Provocateur
 Brave Eagle (1955-1956)
 Trouble at Medicine Creek (1956)
 The Gentle Warrior (1956)
 The Challenge (1955)
 Mask of Manitou (1955)
 Blood Brother (1955)
 TV Reader's Digest (1956) as Geronimo
 Lassie (1955) as Bakka
 Jungle Jim (1955) as Madiero
 Passport to Danger (1955) as Thug
 The Adventures of Rin Tin Tin (1955) as Tumacori

References

External links 

1933 births
1974 deaths
People from Haverhill, Massachusetts
American male film actors
American male television actors
20th-century American male actors